Wolf Trap Creek is a  long 2nd order tributary to the Banister River in Halifax County, Virginia.  This is the only stream of this name in the United States.

Variant names
According to the Geographic Names Information System, it has also been known historically as:
 Wolf Creek

Course 
Wolf Trap Creek rises about 0.5 miles east of Loves Shop, Virginia in Halifax County and then flows east-southeast to join the Banister River about 0.5 miles northeast of Wolf Trap.

Watershed 
Wolf Trap Creek drains  of area, receives about 45.6 in/year of precipitation, has a wetness index of 479.74, and is about 41% forested.

See also 
 List of Virginia Rivers

References 

Rivers of Halifax County, Virginia
Rivers of Virginia